Jorma Kustaa Olavi Nortimo (originally Nieminen, 20 January 1906 – 2 July 1958) was a Finnish film director, screenwriter and actor who also served as a managing director for three different theatres. In films, he started as an actor in 1936 and directed his first film two years later.

Selected filmography 

Pohjalaisia (1936) actor
Lapatossu (1937) actor
Syyllisiäkö? (1938) director
Synnin puumerkki (1942) director
Kuollut mies vihastuu (1944) director and actor
Katarina kaunis leski (1950) actor
Rovaniemen markkinoilla (1951) director and actor
Pikku Ilona ja hänen karitsansa (1957) director

References

External links

1906 births
1958 deaths
Artists from Helsinki
People from Uusimaa Province (Grand Duchy of Finland)
Finnish film directors
20th-century Finnish male actors
Finnish male film actors